Dudok is a surname. Notable people with the surname include:

 Willem Marinus Dudok (1884–1974), Dutch architect
 Evert Dudok (born 1959), Dutch business executive
 Giuliana Dudok (born 2000), Uruguayan swimmer